"Here Without You" is a song by American rock band 3 Doors Down. The power ballad was released on July 28, 2003, as the third single from the band's second studio album, Away from the Sun (2002). The song reached  5 on the US Billboard Hot 100 in November 2003 and was certified double platinum in the US for shipping over 2,000,000 units. It was also successful around the world, peaking at No. 2 in Australia and reaching the top 10 in Denmark, the Netherlands, and New Zealand.

Background and meaning
Brad Arnold stated that the main inspiration for the song was his now ex-wife. Arnold has also explained that the song was written about their lonely nights spent on the road promoting their band and how tough it was to be away from their significant others. "Here Without You" gives the listener a look into the mind of a man that is missing his girlfriend.

Arnold explained the story behind the song: "The song's about being away from someone, or missing them. And it really doesn't matter if you're here without them for all day or all month. It's about the loneliness and missing of somebody. But in a way, people take that as a little bit of a sad song, and I kind of meant it as a happy song, because it's talking about being here without you, but she's still with me in my dreams. And tonight, it's only you and me, so the song was really about that dream. And being in a state of peace, because you've got that person there with you in your sleep. In that way I kind of meant for it to be a little bit of a happy song."

Chart performance
"Here Without You" peaked at No. 5 on the Billboard Hot 100, becoming their third and final top 10 hit, for the week ending November 8, 2003. Only their songs "Kryptonite" and "When I'm Gone" reached higher positions on the chart, peaking at No. 3 and No. 4, respectively. It has since been certified 2× Platinum in the United States and Platinum in Australia. The song was a large success on pop radio, becoming their third No. 1 hit on the Mainstream Top 40 chart and their first No. 1 on the Adult Top 40 chart, where it stayed at the top for 13 weeks.

While one of their most popular songs, "Here Without You" was not a large hit on the band's home format of rock radio, peaking at No. 14 on the Mainstream Rock Songs chart and No. 22 on Alternative Songs. After the song's release, "Here Without You" remained a staple on pop and adult contemporary radio but not on rock or alternative radio. Worldwide, the song reached No. 2 in Australia, becoming the band's highest-charting single there. It also reached the top 10 in Denmark, the Netherlands, and New Zealand as well as the top 20 in Austria, Norway, and Sweden.

Live performances
"Here Without You" was first performed live on December 31, 2002, at First Union Spectrum in Philadelphia. As of April 1, 2019, it has been performed 443 times, making it the fifth most performed song by 3 Doors Down.

Track listings

US promo CD
 "Here Without You" (radio edit) – 3:55
 "Here Without You" (album version) – 3:57

European CD single
 "Here Without You" – 3:57
 "Here Without You" (live) – 4:11

UK and European enhanced CD single
 "Here Without You" (album version) – 3:57
 "Here Without You" (live) – 4:11
 "It's Not Me" (live) – 3:47
 "Here Without You" (video)

Australian enhanced maxi-single
 "Here Without You" (album version) – 3:57
 "Here Without You" (acoustic version) – 3:52
 "Kryptonite" (live) – 4:14
 "Here Without You" (enhanced video—album version) – 3:47

Charts

Weekly charts

Year-end charts

Decade-end charts

All-time charts

Certifications

Release history

In popular culture
"Here Without You" has been featured in the police procedural television series Cold Case, in the episode "The Promise" (2005). The song can also be heard in the sports drama film Goal II (2007).

In November 2005, it was used as the accompanying soundtrack to World Wrestling Entertainment's video tribute to the late Eddie Guerrero, who had died that month.

References

2000s ballads
2002 songs
2003 singles
2004 singles
3 Doors Down songs
APRA Award winners
Music videos directed by Marc Webb
Republic Records singles
Rock ballads
Song recordings produced by Rick Parashar
Songs written by Brad Arnold
Songs written by Chris Henderson (American musician)
Songs written by Matt Roberts (musician)
Songs written by Todd Harrell
Universal Music Group singles